Gwanghae-gun or Prince Gwanghae (4 June 1575 – 7 August 1641), personal name Yi Hon (Hangul: 이혼, Hanja: 李琿), was the 15th ruler of the Joseon Dynasty of Korea. As he was deposed in a coup d'état, he did not receive a temple name.

Biography

Birth and background 
Gwanghaegun was the second son of King Seonjo, born to Lady Kim Gong-bin, a concubine. When Japan invaded Korea to attack the Ming Empire, he was installed as Crown Prince. When the king fled north to the border of Ming, he set up a branch court and fought defensive battles. During and after the Seven Year War (1592–1598), he acted as the de facto ruler of the Joseon Dynasty, commanding battles and taking care of the reconstruction of the nation after the devastating wars, in the place of old and weak King Seonjo.

Although it brought prestige to him, his position was still unstable. He had an elder but incompetent brother Prince Imhae (Imhaegun, 임해군, 臨海君) and a younger but legitimate brother Grand Prince Yeongchang (Yeongchang Daegun, 영창대군, 永昌大君), who was supported by the Lesser Northerners faction. Fortunately for Gwanghae, King Seonjo's abrupt death made it impossible for his favorite son Yeongchang to succeed to the throne.

Violence of Greater Northerner faction 
Before King Seonjo died, he named Prince Gwanghae as his official successor to the throne and ordered his advisers to make a royal document. However, Lyu Young-gyong of the Lesser Northerners faction hid the document and plotted to install Grand Prince Yeongchang as king, only to be found out by the head of the Great Northerners faction (대북; 大北), Jeong In-hong. Lyu was executed immediately and Grand Prince Yeongchang was arrested and died the next year.

After the incident, Gwanghae tried to bring officials from various political and regional background to his court, but his plan was interrupted by Greater Northerners including Yi I-cheom and Jeong In-hong. Then, Greater Northerners began to take members of other political factions out of the government, especially Lesser Northerners. In 1613, the Greater Northerners moved against Grand Prince Yeongchang; his grandfather Kim Je-nam was found guilty of treason and executed, while Yeong-chang was sent into exile, where he too was executed. At the same time, Greater Northerners suppressed the Lesser Northerners; in 1618, Yeongchang's mother, Queen Inmok, was stripped of her title and imprisoned. Gwanghae had no power to stop this even though he was the official head of the government.

Achievements 
Despite his poor reputation after his death, he was a talented and pragmatic politician. He endeavored to restore the country and sponsored the restoration of documents. As a part of reconstruction, he revised land ordinance and redistributed land to the people; he also ordered the rebuilding of Changdeok Palace along with several other palaces. Additionally, he was responsible for the reintroduction of the hopae identification system after a long period of disuse.

In foreign affairs he sought a balance between the Ming Empire and the Manchus. Since he realized Joseon was unable to compete with Manchu military power, he tried to maintain friendly relationship with the Manchus while the kingdom was still under the suzerainty of Ming, which angered the Ming and dogmatic Confucian Koreans. The critically worsened Manchu-Ming relationship forced him to send ten thousand soldiers to aid Ming in 1619. However, the Battle of Sarhū ended in Manchu's overwhelming victory. The Korean General Gang Hong-rip lost two-thirds of his troops and surrendered to Nurhaci. Gwanghaegun negotiated independently for peace with the Manchus and managed to avoid another war. He also restored diplomatic relationship with Japan in 1609 when he reopened trade with Japan through Treaty of Giyu, and sent his ambassadors to Japan in 1617.

In the domestic sphere, Gwanghaegun implemented the Daedong law, which let his subjects pay their taxes more easily. However, this law was activated only in Gyeonggi Province, which was the largest granary zone at that time, and it took a century for the law to be extended across the whole kingdom.  He encouraged publishing in order to accelerate reconstruction and to restore the kingdom's former prosperity. Many books were written during his reign, including the medical book Dongui Bogam, and several historical records were rewritten in this period.  In 1616, tobacco was first introduced to Korea and it soon became popular amongst the Korean aristocracy.

Dethronement and later life 
On April 11, 1623, Gwanghaegun was deposed in a coup by the Westerners faction. The coup directed by Kim Yu took place at night, Gwanghaegun fled but was captured later. He was confined first on Ganghwa Island and then on Jeju Island, where he died in 1641. He does not have a royal mausoleum like the other Joseon rulers. His and Lady Ryu's remains were buried at a comparatively humble site in Namyangju in Gyeonggi Province. The Westerners faction installed Neungyanggun as the sixteenth king Injo who promulgated pro-Ming and anti-Manchu policies, which resulted in two subsequent Manchu invasions.

Legacy 

Gwanghaegun is one of only two deposed kings who were not restored and given a temple name (the other one being Yeonsangun). 

He remains a polarizing figure among historians. Historian Oh Hang-nyeong strongly criticized the king, writing that he “practically used up the country’s entire budget solely for the construction of palaces, his policies were flawed and moreover, he was absent in many of the cabinet meetings. Gwanghaegun failed to communicate with his servants and with his people.” However, historian Lee Duk-il praised the king, did that he “indeed made some political errors, but during his reign, the famous oriental medical book "Donguibogam’' was published and he created the tax system "Daedong law" that was enforced for the benefit of the people.” Despite the controversy over the king's handling of domestic policies, most historians have a positive assessment of Gwanghae's acts regarding foreign affairs.

Family 
Father: King Seonjo of Joseon (조선 선조) (26 November 1552 – 16 March 1608)
Grandfather: Grand Internal Prince Deokheung (이초 덕흥대원군) (2 April 1530 – 14 June 1559)
Grandmother: Grand Internal Princess Consort Hadong of the Hadong Jeong clan (하동부대부인 정씨) (23 September 1522 – 24 June 1567)
Mother: Royal Noble Consort Gong of the Gimhae Kim clan (공빈 김씨) (16 November 1553 – 13 June 1577)
Grandfather: Kim Hee-cheol (김희철, 金希哲) (1519 – 1 August 1592)
Grandmother: Lady Gwon of the Andong Gwon clan (정경부인 안동 권씨, 貞敬夫人 安東 權氏)

Consorts and their Respective Issue(s):

 Deposed Queen Yu of the Munhwa Yu clan (폐비 유씨) (15 August 1576 – 31 October 1623)
 Unnamed child (? – 1592)
 First son (1596 – 1596)
 Yi Ji, Deposed Crown Prince (이지 폐세자) (31 December 1598 – 22 July 1623), second son
 Third son (1601 – 1603)
 Royal Consort So-ui of the Papyeong Yun clan (? – 14 March 1623) (소의 윤씨)
 Princess Hwain (1619–1664) (옹주)
 Royal Consort So-ui of the Pungsan Hong clan (소의 홍씨) (? – 1623)
 Royal Consort So-ui of the Andong Gwon clan (숙의 권씨)
 Royal Consort Sug-ui of the Yangcheon Heo clan (숙의 허씨)
 Royal Consort Sug-ui of the Wonju Won clan (숙의 원씨)
 Royal Consort So-yong of the Dongnae Jeong clan (소용 정씨) (? – 1623)
 Royal Consort So-yong of the Pungcheon Im clan (소용 임씨) (1598 – 1628)
 Royal Consort So-won of the Yeongsan Shin clan (소원 신씨)
 Royal Consort Sug-won of the Han clan (숙원 한씨)
 Court Lady Kim (상궁 김씨) (1584 – 1623)
 Court Lady Yi (상궁 이씨)
 Court Lady Choe (상궁 최씨)
 Court Lady Jo of the Hanyang Jo clan (궁인 조씨)
 Court Lady Byeon (궁인 변씨)

In popular culture

Film and television 
Portrayed by Kim Kyu-chul in the 1995 TV Series West Palace.
Portrayed by Lee Ho-seong in the 2008 TV series Tamra, the Island.
Portrayed by Kim Seung-soo in the 1999–2000 TV series Hur Jun.
Portrayed by Ji Sung in the 2003 TV series The King's Woman.
Portrayed by Lee In in the 2004–2005 TV series Immortal Admiral Yi Sun-sin.
Portrayed by Lee Byung-hun in the 2012 film Masquerade.
Portrayed by Lee Sang-yoon in the 2013 TV series Goddess of Fire.
Portrayed by In Gyo-jin in the MBC TV series Hur Jun, The Original Story.
Portrayed by Seo In-guk in the 2014 TV series The King's Face.
Portrayed by Cha Seung-won and Lee Tae-hwan in the 2015 MBC TV series Splendid Politics.
Portrayed by Noh Young-hak in the 2013 TV series Goddess of Fire (young version) and 2015 TV series The Jingbirok: A Memoir of Imjin War.
Portrayed by Yeo Jin-goo in the 2017 film Warriors of the Dawn and the 2019 tv series The Crowned Clown. 
Portrayed by Jung Joon-ho in the 2019 TV series The Tale of Nokdu.
Portrayed by Jang Hyun-sung in the 2020 film The Swordsman.
Portrayed by Kim Tae-woo in the 2021 MBN TV Series Bossam: Steal the Fate.

Music 

 Referenced in rapper Agust D's 2020 regnal march inspired Daechwita. Both the song's lyrics and accompanying Lumpens music video draw further from the 2012 film Masquerade with Agust D portraying a scarred tyrant threatened by the arrival of his modern era doppelganger.

Literature 
Gwanghae's Lover, a 2013 novel written by Euodia. Originally posted on web portal Naver, it is a love story about Gwanghae and a time traveling high school girl.

See also 

 List of monarchs of Korea

References 

 

 
1575 births
1641 deaths
Leaders ousted by a coup
17th-century Korean monarchs
16th-century Korean monarchs
Regents of Korea
Dethroned monarchs
Monarchs who abdicated
People from Seoul